"Mammy Sutra" is the name of a live episode of the British comedy television series Mrs. Brown's Boys. It was also streamed by On-demend video service RTÉ Player.

The episode was broadcast at 9:45pm (BST) on BBC One in England, Scotland, Wales and Northern Ireland. The episode was also broadcast on RTÉ One in Republic of Ireland and Northern Ireland . In total viewers on BBC One, the episode attracted 9.09 Million viewers, putting the episode onto 1st place as the most watched show on BBC One between 18 July and 24 July.

It was announced on 23 September 2015 (the same day ITV soap opera Coronation Street had a live episode), that the show would return for a one off live episode in celebration of the 60th anniversary of sitcoms airing on BBC One. The episode was commissioned by Charlotte Moore as being the launchpad for BBC One's Landmark Sitcom Season airing in July 2016.

Rehearsals

A cast and crew script read though took place on 13 July. A camera/sound rehearsal took place on 21 July. An audience recorded rehearsal took place on 22 July. The live studio recording took place on 23 July.

Summary
When Agnes discovers that Mark and Betty are having bedroom problems, she takes it upon herself to help. Meanwhile, as Dermot's business grows, he has a difficult decision to make about his best friend Buster.

Cast
Agnes Brown - Brendan O'Carroll
Dermot Brown - Paddy Houlihan
Maria Brown - Fiona O'Carroll
Buster Brady - Danny O'Carroll
Grandad - Dermot O'Neill
Father Damien - Conor Moloney
Winnie McGoogan - Eilish O'Carroll
Cathy Brown - Jennifer Gibney
Mark Brown - Pat 'Pepsi' Shields
Betty Brown - Amanda Woods
Rory Brown - Rory Cowan
Dino Doyle - Gary Hollywood
Sharon McGoogan - Fiona Gibney

References

Mrs. Brown's Boys
2016 British television episodes
Anniversary television episodes
Republic of Ireland television episodes
BBC television sitcoms
Television episodes set in the Republic of Ireland